Hermogenes Valdebenito (3 June 1901 – 20 April 1979) was a Chilean fencer. He competed in the individual foil event at the 1936 Summer Olympics.

References

External links
 

1901 births
1979 deaths
Chilean male foil fencers
Olympic fencers of Chile
Fencers at the 1936 Summer Olympics
20th-century Chilean people